not to be confused with the Queen of Sheba's Palace in Axum or the Queen of Sheba's Palace (Sumharam) near Salalah, Oman.

Saba' Palace is a palace in Aden, Yemen. It overlooks the Arabian Sea.

Buildings and structures in Aden
Palaces in Yemen